Sergey Galoyan (born 25 December 1981) is an ASCAP/PRS Award–winning songwriter/producer and DJ, born in Moscow. He is more commonly known as Sergio Galoyan and is of Armenian descent.

One of the creators of the band t.A.T.u., he wrote and produced their first four singles All the Things She Said, Not Gonna Get Us, 30 Minutes, and Show Me Love. He also wrote and produced many other tracks for their first, second and third albums.

Galoyan has also worked with Keith Flint (The Prodigy), Marilyn Manson, Jennifer Lopez, Valeriya, Clea Halsey and Alsou (on 19). 

He married t.A.T.u.'s PR manager, Sasha Tityanko, after working on t.A.T.u.'s second album, but they divorced soon after.

Galoyan is currently concentrating on his solo DJ project under the name of Sergio Galoyan, which features various vocalists and songwriters from around the world.

Discography

As an artist

Singles
 2010: Everything - Sergio Galoyan (feat. Nire' Alldai)
 2011: Knowing You - Sergio Galoyan (feat. Tamra Keenan)
 2011: Break The Night In Two - Sergio Galoyan (feat. Antonio)
 2011: Stay Hungry, Stay Foolish - Sergio Galoyan
 2012: Paradise - Sergio Galoyan (feat. Lena Katina)

As a composer/producer
 2001: Ya Soshla S Uma (Я Сошла С Ума) (I've Lost My Mind) - t.A.T.u.
 2001: Nas Ne Dogonyat (Нас Не Догонят) (Not Gonna Get Us) - t.A.T.u.
 2001: 30 Minut (30 Минут) (30 Minutes) (also called Polchasa) - t.A.T.u.
 2001: Ya Tvoya Ne Pervaya (Я Твоя Не Первая) (I Am Not Your First) (also called Pokazhi Mne Lyubov) - t.A.T.u.
 2001: Mal'chik-Gey (Mальчик-Гей) (Gay Boy) - t.A.T.u.
 2002: Not Gonna Get Us - t.A.T.u.
 2002: All the Things She Said - t.A.T.u.
 2002: Show Me Love - t.A.T.u.
 2002: 30 Minutes - t.A.T.u.
 2002: Malchik Gay - t.A.T.u.
 2002: Ya Soshla S Uma - t.A.T.u.
 2002: Nas Ne Dogonyat - t.A.T.u.
 2005: Cosmos (Outer Space) – t.A.T.u.
 2005: Sacrifice – t.A.T.u.
 2005: Perfect Enemy – t.A.T.u.
 2005: Vsya Moya Lyubov (Вся Моя Любовь) – t.A.T.u.
 2008: Marsianskie Glaza (Марсианские Глаза) (Martian Eyes) – t.A.T.u.
 2008: Wild - Valeriya
 2008: Break it All - Valeriya
 2008: I Know - Valeriya
 2008: Out of Control - Valeriya
 2008: Love Sick - Valeriya
 2008: Here I Am - Valeriya
 2008: No One - Valeriya
 2008: There I’ll Be - Valeriya
 2008: Where Are You? - Valeriya
 2008: Romantic - Valeriya
 2013: Paradise — Lena Katina
 2013: Kosmos — Vintage
 2019: Nightmare — Halsey

Remixes
 2001: Ya Soshla S Uma (Sergio Galoyan Mix) - t.A.T.u.
 2002: Dozhd (Sergio Galoyan Mix) - Alsou
 2003: I'm Glad (Sergio Galoyan Mix) - Jennifer Lopez
 2004: Download It (Sergio Dance Edit) - Clea (band)
 2005: This Is the New *hit (Sergio Galoyan Mix) - Marilyn Manson
 2006: No Numbers (Sergio Galoyan Version) - Keith Flint
 2010: Love Dealer (Sergio Galoyan Mix) - Justin Timberlake Feat. Esmee Denters

List Of Achievements By Year
	2000	    Russia/Video Clip/Song "Ya Soshla S Uma"/   1st place/Top of the Charts on TV Channels, Radio Channels
	2001   	    Russia/Song "Nas Ne Dogonyat"/  1st place/Top of the Charts on TV Channels, Radio Channels
	2001	    Russia/Album Release "200 Po Vstrechnoy"/ 1st place/Top of the Charts on TV Channels, Radio Channels, Record Sale
	2001 Hit FM award "100 Pound Hit" for "Ya Soshla S Uma" https://web.archive.org/web/20080408095007/http://gallery.tatushow.com/displayimage.php?album=737&pos=1
	2001	    Russia/Song "30 Minut"/ 1st place/Top of the Charts on TV Channels, Radio Channels, Record Sale
 2002	    Worldwide/ Release of English Version of the Album "200 Km in a Wrong Lane/ 1st place worldwide/Top of the Charts in Most of the Countries in the World/Record Sale/Top on Official Music and Country Charts 
	2002	  Worldwide/Single of the Song "All Things She Said"/ Record Sale 1st place/Top ono the Official Music and Country Charts/Record
	2002 Hit FM - award "100 Pound Hit" for "Nas Ne Dogonyat"
	2002 Ovaciya Award - Best song of the year "Nas Ne Dogonyat"
	2002 Russian Grammy Awards - Best Song "Nas Ne Dogonyat"
	2002 IFPI Platinum Europe Award for 1 million sales of the album "200 Po Vstrechnoy" https://web.archive.org/web/20131016055449/http://www.ifpi.org/content/section_news/plat2002.html
	2003	 Worldwide/Single of the Song "Not Gonna Get Us"/ Record Sale 1st place/Top ono the Official Music and Country Charts/Record 
	2003	   Russia/Remix on Song by Alsou "Dojd"/ 1st Place on Radio and Television/Top One on the Charts in Russia
	2003 IFPI Platinum Europe Award for 1 million sales of the album 200 km/h in the Wrong Lane. https://web.archive.org/web/20131103083215/http://www.ifpi.org/content/section_news/plat2003.html
	2003 Polish Internet Music Awards - Best International Album 200 km/h in the Wrong Lane http://eng.tatysite.net/news/archive.php?id=608_0_5_0
	2003  IFPI Hong Kong Top Sales Music Awards - Top 10 Best Selling Foreign Albums 200 km/h in the Wrong Lane
	Eska Music Awards «Best International Album» «200 km/h in the Wrong Lane»
	2004	   Award from the American Society of Composers, Authors and 
Publishers (ASCAP Award) for Song "All Things She Said" as one of the best songs of the year
	2004 College Song of the Year (BMI Honors) 
Winners "All the Things She Said"
	2004 BMI Pop Award (BMI Honors) Winners "All the Things She Said"
	2004 Japan Gold Disc Award - Rock Album of the Year 200 km/h in the Wrong Lane http://www.riaj.or.jp/e/data/gdisc/2004.html
	2007	   Russia/Single Song "Mi Vmeste" performed by Valeria 1st Place on Radio/Song received three awards in Russia: Song of the    
Year Award/Record of the Year/Russian Grammy (Golden Gramafon")
	2008	   Russia/Single Song "Wild" performed by Valeria/ 1st Place on Radio and TV/Song was awarded platinum status in Russian
	2008	Release of Album by Valeria on an international level, which included songs "Mi Vmeste" and "Wild".  Song "Wild" was awarded 21st Place in the American Chart "Billboard" and 11th Place in the British Chart "Music Week"
	2008	Russia/ Release of Single Song "Break It All" performed by Valeria  Top 5 songs in Russia
	2008	Russia/Release of Single Song "I Know" performed by Valeria Top Ten Songs in Russia
	2008	Viva Channel Germany #3 For "All the Things She Said" in The biggest hits ever
	2009	 Received Medal "Talent and Calling" by "International Alliance  Peacemaker" Organization
	2010	Russia/Produced a Single Song "Noch" performed by Jasmin Top Ten Songs in Russia on TV and Radio
	2011	Eastern Europe/Single Song "Sergio Galayan feat. Nire Alldai – "Everything" Top Five on Radio and TV in Russia, Ukraine and Eastern Europe
	2011	Received Medal 2nd Degree for "Talent and Calling" by "International Alliance Peacemaker" Organization
	2011	Received Medal from "Emperor Society of Russia" Organization as a Recognition of Artistic Talent 
	2012	United States/Release of Song "Sergio Galayan feat. Tamra  Keenan – Knowing You" in the United States and Rotating on the several radio channels in the United States
	2014 	Olympic Committee of Russian Federation Selected Song "Nas Ne Dogonyat" as Anthem of Russian Olympic Team.  Song was played during Opening of Olympic Games in Sochi and During Introduction of the Russian Olympic Team

The same song was selected as an anthem for Russian Olympic Team during the Paralympic Games in Sochi.

The same song was selected as an anthem for Russian Hockey Team during International Championships.

References

External links

 Sergio Galoyan's Official Site
 Sergio Galoyan's Official Twitter
 Galoyan's Recordproduction.com video interview
 Galoyan's Resolution magazine interview
 Сергей Галоян - начало творческой карьеры...

1981 births
Living people
Russian record producers
Russian people of Armenian descent
T.A.T.u.
Musicians from Moscow
Russian male composers